Termi (also spelled Tarmi) is a census town in the Chandrapura CD block in the Bermo subdivision of the Bokaro district in the Indian state of Jharkhand.

Geography

Location                  

Area overview
Bokaro district consists of undulating uplands on the Chota Nagpur Plateau with the Damodar River cutting a valley right across. The East Bokaro Coalfield located in the Bermo-Phusro area and small intrusions of Jharia Coalfield make Bokaro a coal rich district. In 1965, one of the largest steel manufacturing units in the country, Bokaro Steel Plant, operated by Steel Authority of India Limited, was set-up at Bokaro Steel City. The Damodar Valley Corporation established its first thermal power station at Bokaro (Thermal). The soil is generally infertile and agriculture is mostly rain-fed.

Note: The map alongside presents some of the notable locations in the district. All places marked in the map are linked in the larger full screen map.

Demographics
According to the 2011 Census of India, Termi had a total population of 5,111, of which 2,680 (52%) were males and 2,431 (48%) were females. Population in the age range 0-6 years was 671. The total number of literate persons in Termi was 3,631 (81.78% of the population over 6 years).

Infrastructure
According to the District Census Handbook 2011, Bokaro, Termi covered an area of 5.22 km2. Among the civic amenities, it had 7 km roads with open drains, the protected watersupply involved tapwater from treated sources, uncovered well, overhead tank. It had 998 domestic electric connections. Among the medical facilities, it had 8 hospitals, 8 dispensaries, 8 health centres, 8 family welfare centres, 8 maternity and child welfare centres, 8 maternity homes, 8 nursing homes, no medicine shop. Among the educational facilities it had 2 primary schools, the nearest middle school at Narra 1.5 km away, 1 senior secondary school. Among the social, recreational and cultural facilities it had 1 stadium. It had the branch office of 1 nationalised bank.

References

Cities and towns in Bokaro district